The Grand Duchy of Luxembourg has long been a prominent supporter of European political and economic integration. In 1921, Luxembourg and Belgium formed the Belgium-Luxembourg Economic Union (BLEU) to create an inter-exchangeable currency and a common customs regime. Post-war, Luxembourg became a founding member state of the United Nations, and dropped its policy of neutrality to become a founding member state of NATO. Luxembourg expanded its support for European integration, becoming a founding member state of the Benelux Economic Union (today's Benelux Union), and one of the "inner six" founding member states of the three European Communities; the European Coal and Steel Community (ECSC), the European Atomic Energy Community (Euratom),  and the European Economic Community (EEC). Subsequently, Luxembourg became a founding member state of the European Union (EU) when the EEC and ECSC were incorporated into it in 1993. Luxembourg is a founding member of the Schengen Area, abolishing internal borders amongst its member states, named after the Luxembourg village where the original agreement — since incorporated into EU law — was signed in 1985. At the same time, the majority of Luxembourgers have consistently believed that European unity makes sense only in the context of a dynamic transatlantic relationship, and thus have traditionally pursued a pro-NATO, pro-US foreign policy.

Luxembourg is the site of the European Court of Justice, the European Investment Bank, the European Court of Auditors, the secretariat of the European Parliament, the Statistical Office of the European Commission (Eurostat), and other EU bodies.

Relations by continent

Africa

Americas

Asia

Europe

Oceania

Relations by organization

NATO

United Nations

See also
 List of diplomatic missions in Luxembourg
 List of diplomatic missions of Luxembourg
 List of ambassadors to Luxembourg
 Ministry of Foreign Affairs (Luxembourg)

References

Further reading

External links
Ministry of Foreign Affairs of Luxembourg
Australia Department of Foreign Affairs and Trade about the relations with Luxembourg